Mohsen Foroughi (Persian: محسن فروغی; May 14, 1907–date of death unknown), was an Iranian architect, and one of the founders in 1945 of the influential Association of Iranian Architects.

References

20th-century Iranian politicians
20th-century Iranian architects
1907 births

Year of death missing